Bloomington is a census-designated place (CDP) in Victoria County, Texas, United States. The population was 2,459 at the 2010 census.  It is included in the Victoria, Texas, Metropolitan Statistical Area.

Geography
Bloomington is located at  (28.646639, -96.896556). According to the United States Census Bureau, the CDP has a total area of 2.7 square miles (6.9 km2), all land.

Demographics

2020 census

As of the 2020 United States census, there were 2,082 people, 478 households, and 352 families residing in the CDP.

2000 census
As of the census of 2000, 2,562 people, 771 households, and 616 families resided in the CDP. The population density was 961.4 people per square mile (371.9/km). There were 921 housing units at an average density of 345.6/sq mi (133.7/km). The racial makeup of the CDP was 53.08% White, 6.28% African American, 0.66% Native American, 0.08% Asian, 0.20% Pacific Islander, 36.46% from other races, and 3.24% from two or more races. Hispanics or Latinos of any race were 67.56% of the population.

Of the 771 households, 46.6% had children under the age of 18 living with them, 62.8% were married couples living together, 11.4% had a female householder with no husband present, and 20.1% were not families. About 17.4% of all households were made up of individuals, and 6.9% had someone living alone who was 65 years of age or older. The average household size was 3.32 and the average family size was 3.77.

In the CDP, the population was distributed as 37.1% under the age of 18, 10.5% from 18 to 24, 27.2% from 25 to 44, 16.4% from 45 to 64, and 8.9% who were 65 years of age or older. The median age was 27 years. For every 100 females, there were 96.2 males. For every 100 females age 18 and over, there were 92.4 males.

The median income for a household in the CDP was $30,167, and for a family was $34,398. Males had a median income of $36,318 versus $18,500 for females. The per capita income for the CDP was $10,332. About 16.2% of families and 20.4% of the population were below the poverty line, including 19.8% of those under age 18 and 12.8% of those age 65 or over.

Notable person

Gale Storm, singer and actress, whose career was chiefly in the 1940s and 1950s

Education
Bloomington is served by the Bloomington Independent School District.

References

External links
 Victoria Economic Development Corporation economic development

Census-designated places in Texas
Census-designated places in Victoria County, Texas
Victoria, Texas metropolitan area